Mount Dajian is a mountain in Heping District, Taichung, Taiwan with an elevation of .

See also
List of mountains in Taiwan

References

Landforms of Taichung
Dajian